The Whitefish River is a  river in Census Division 21 in the Northern Region of Manitoba, Canada. It is in the Hudson Bay and Nelson River drainage basins and is a left tributary of the Saskatchewan River.

Course
The river begins at Rocky Lake and heads east to Root Lake.

Tributaries
Red Rock Creek (left)
Dinner Place Creek (right)
Rocky Lake
Maria Creek

See also
List of rivers of Manitoba

References

Rivers of Manitoba
Tributaries of Hudson Bay